Fortune City One is one of the two shopping centres of City One, Sha Tin, New Territories, Hong Kong. It is owned by Cheung Kong Holdings. It is connected to nearly apartments and another shopping centre in City One, Fortune City One Plus, just across the street, by bridges.

Transportation
MTR
Tuen Ma line City One station
Kowloon Motor Bus
49X - Sha Tin (Kwong Yuen) ↔ Tsing Yi Ferry
73A - Sha Tin (Yu Chui Court) ↔ Fanling (Wah Ming)
80K - Sun Chui ↔ Yu Chui Court
82C - Sha Tin (Kwong Yuen) ↔ Hong Kong Science Park Phase III (Rush Time Service)
82K - Wong Nai Tau ↔ Mei Lam
82X - Ravana Garden ↺ Wong Tai Sin
84M - Chevalier Garden ↔ Lok Fu
85A - Kwong Yuen ↔ Kowloon City Ferry
86 - Wong Nai Tau ↔ Mei Foo
89X - Sha Tin station ↔ Kwun Tong (Tsui Ping Road)
240X - Wong Nai Tau ↔ Kwai Hing station (Rush Time Service)
281A - Sha Tin (Kwong Yuen) ↔ Kowloon station
Long Win Bus
A41 - Airport (Ground Transportation Centre) ↔ Sha Tin (Yu Chui Court)
N42 - Tung Chung station ↔ Ma On Shan (Yiu On) (Midnight Service)
NA41 - Hong Kong-Zhuhai-Macao Bridge Hong Kong Port ↔ Sha Tin (Shui Chuen O) (Midnight Service)
Cross Harbour Tunnel Bus
182 - Yu Chui Court ↔ Central (Macau Ferry)
N182 - Sha Tin (Kwong Yuen) ↔ Central (Macau Ferry)
682B - Shui Chuen O Estate ↔ Chai Wan (East) (Rush Time Service)
682C - City One Shatin ↔ North Point (Rush Time Service)

References

 

Yuen Chau Kok
Sha Tin
Sha Tin District
Shopping centres in Hong Kong
CK Hutchison Holdings